AOO may refer to:
 All Over Ornamented, a pottery style in prehistoric European Beaker culture
 Altoona–Blair County Airport IATA code
 Apache OpenOffice
 Area of Occupancy, another term for scaling pattern of occupancy, the way in which species distribution changes across spatial scales